Michaela Gosselin (born January 31, 2001) is a Canadian para alpine skier who competed at the 2022 Winter Paralympics. Michaela is a current member of the Canadian Para Alpine Ski Team.

Career
Gosselin made her debut at the 2021 World Para Snow Sports Championships held in Lillehammer, Norway where she won the bronze medal in the slalom event. She qualified to compete at the 2022 Winter Paralympics held in Beijing, China.

References

External links
 
 2022 Winter Paralympics: Michaela Gosselin at the International Paralympic Committee

2001 births
Living people
Sportspeople from Collingwood, Ontario
Canadian female alpine skiers
Alpine skiers at the 2022 Winter Paralympics